Crawlspace is a 2004 animated short film, written, directed and animated by Peter Sved as his graduation piece at The Australian Film, Television and Radio School in Sydney.

Plot
A strange man stuck in a desert wakes from his coma and goes in search of water. He discovers a lush green forest, alive with plants and animals the likes of which he could never have dreamt of. He finds a watersnake (a bizarre creature that is a snake with a human hand as its head; is made of a semi-transparent fluid; has the ability to float in air) that has been captured by a giant plant that resembles a venus flytrap, and rescues the strange creature from its clutches. In return, the creature reveals to him the secret place in the forest where water can be found.

Festival screenings and awards

Festivals 
Hiroshima International Animation Festival 2004, Japan (Winner – Stars of Students Award)
ComGraph 2004: Asia-Pacific Digital Art & Animation Competition, Singapore (Winner – Merit Award, Student Computer Animation Section)
Australian Effects and Animation Festival 2004, Sydney (Nomination, Best Graduation Film)
Asiana International Short Film Festival 2004, Seoul, Korea
Asia Pacific Film Festival 2004, Kuala Lumpur, Malaysia
St Kilda Film Festival 2004, Melbourne
Mill Valley Film Festival 2004, California, USA
Trebon International Animation Festival 2005, Czech Republic
Ecozine International Film Festival 2009, Spain

Nominations 
2005 MPSE Nomination for Best Sound in Student film for Derryn Pasquil's sound design
2005 MPSE Golden Reel Nomination, LA, for Tamara O'Brien's original score

External links

clip from the film from AFTRS vault on youtube
2000s animated short films
2004 films
Student films
Australian animated short films
2004 animated films
2004 short films
2000s Australian animated films
2000s English-language films
2000s Australian films